Box Head is a coastal locality, not a suburb, of the Central Coast region of New South Wales, Australia, in the  local government area.

It is within Bouddi National Park in close proximity to several beaches, including Iron Ladder Beach, Lobster Beach and Tallow Beach. The headland itself marks the northern entrance to Broken Bay from the Tasman Sea. Box Head refers to the large headland that viewed from the ocean resembles a box. This part of the coastland was first sighted by Europeans under James Cook, who named features of the area such as Cape Three Points and Broken Bay following his discovery of Botany Bay.

References

Suburbs of the Central Coast (New South Wales)
Headlands of New South Wales